Simms School Building is a historic elementary school building located at Huntington, Cabell County, West Virginia. It was built in 1919–1920, and is a two-story wire brick, steel frame building in the Classical Revival style. It has a square plan, with a center auditorium surrounded by a circular corridor with classrooms on three sides. The front entrance has a center colonnade with four round limestone Doric order columns capped with a limestone frieze and projecting cornice.  The second floor features an open porch with wood columns and a projecting cornice topped by a clay tile mansard roof.  An addition was completed in 1964.  The school closed after 1980, and it now houses 20 apartment units for the elderly.

It was listed on the National Register of Historic Places in 1997.

References

Apartment buildings in West Virginia
Neoclassical architecture in West Virginia
Defunct schools in West Virginia
Educational institutions disestablished in 1980
Former school buildings in the United States
National Register of Historic Places in Cabell County, West Virginia
School buildings completed in 1920
Schools in Cabell County, West Virginia
School buildings on the National Register of Historic Places in West Virginia
Buildings and structures in Huntington, West Virginia